Robert George Brown was a footballer who played in the Football League for Accrington Stanley, Rotherham County and Bradford City.

References

English footballers
Accrington Stanley F.C. (1891) players
Bradford City A.F.C. players
Rotherham County F.C. players
Stoke City F.C. wartime guest players
English Football League players
Year of birth missing
Year of death missing
Association football outside forwards